Stångån is a small river in southern Sweden, 185 km long and with a drainage basin of 2440 km2. It flows from the highlands of eastern Småland in the south to lake Roxen in the north. At the outlet near Linköping, the average discharge is 15 m3 per second.

It passes through Vimmerby, Kisa, and Linköping. A great deal of the river is extended to a canal, Kinda Canal. A railway takes the same course as the river.

Stångån passes through the deciduous forests of one of Sweden's main cultural areas, featuring several great manor houses of the nobility.

References

Rivers of Östergötland County
Motala ström basin